Agroha is a town in Haryana state of northern India. It is situated in Hisar district in between Hisar city and Fatehabad on NH 09. Ancient structures, pot-shards, coins and seals have been found in archaeological excavations at the Agroha Mound.  The Agrawal and Agrahari communities claim origin from Agroha. According to their legends, Agroha was the capital of their founder Maharaj Agrasena.

History

Early history

Agroha remained an important centre of commerce and political activity till the period of Feroze Shah Tughluq as it was situated on the ancient trade route between Taxila and Mathura. Earlier excavations proved the potentiality of the site and its ancient name 'Agrodaka', headquarters of a Janapada.

The Agroha mound goes back to the 3rd century BC and is where Harappan coins were discovered apart from stone sculptures, terracotta seals, iron and copper implements, shells and a host of other things.

Recent excavations have yielded five cultural periods ranging from circa fourth century to fourteenth century AD. The excavations have also revealed two ancient shrines namely a Buddhist stupa and a Hindu temple.

Mughal era
Agroha is listed in the Ain-i-Akbari as a pargana under Hisar sarkar, producing a revenue of 1,743,970 dams for the imperial treasury and supplying a force of 2000 infantry and 200 cavalry. It appears with the note "Game of all kind abounds. Sport chiefly hawking."

Contemporary
 See: Agroha Dham

In 1976, the then Chief Minister of Haryana Banarsi Das Gupta started the development of Agroha under the banner of "Agroha Vikas Trust". A huge Temple of Maharaja Agrasen, Mata Lakshmi (Kuldevi of Agarwal and traders community) and Mata Saraswati was constructed there and which was inaugurated by Rajiv Gandhi.

Subsequently, Banarsi Das Gupta's initiatives led to the formation of Agroha Development Board. In first ever meeting, a decision was taken that in the name of Maharaja Agrasen "Maharaja Agrasen Medical College" will be established in Agroha. It was Shri Gupta’s persistence that the Haryana Government released 267 acres of land to the Agarwal Society for the Medical College, for just Re. 1 in lease. The Government also make an agreement with the society under which the Government decided to bear 50% of the development amount, and to hand over the managements to the Agarwal Society while contributing 99% of the maintenance fee; once the Medical College is developed. The remaining 1% is to be borne by the Agarwal Society. It was this agreement which increased the momentum of the development of the Medical College and the AGROHA. Maharaja Agrasen Medical College, Agroha was established in 1994.

During the last 20 years Agroha Vikas Trust has done a lot of development of this Holy town, and a modern lodging and boarding facility is now available. A number of temples have been constructed in the Complex, including the Sheetla mata temple and Hanuman temple.

Demographics
As of 2011 India census, Agroha had a population of 7722 in 1491 households. Males (4068) constitute 52.68%  of the population and females (3654) 47.31%. Agroha has an average literacy (4522) rate of 58.55%, less than the national average of 74%: male literacy (2659) is 58.8%, and female literacy (1863) is 41.19%. In Agroha, 13.71% of the population is under 6 years of age (1059).

Famous residents
 Agroha is the birthplace of Best Wrestler of India Geetika Jakhar who won silver medal at Asian Games held at Doha in 2006 also a Bronze at Asian Games 2014 and  a Silver at Commonwealth Games 2014 .
 Agroha is the birthplace of the athlete Krishna Poonia who won gold medal after 52 years in the discus throw in the Commonwealth Games  2010 held in Delhi. she is the first indian women who won gold meadle in track & fields events . She also won bronze medal in Asian games 2006 nd 2010 . she is honoured by Bhim award from Haryana government as well as with Arjuna award nd Padam shree from center government. She is currently national record holder in discus throw with distance of 64.76 meter. Her father that is MAHA SINGH SURA nd family currently living in this village. She is now sitting MLA of Congress party in Rajasthan assembly from Sadulpur constituency of district Churu of rajasthan.she is married to shri virender poonia of rajasthan (former national record holder of Hammer throw )

See also

 Agrasen ki Baoli
 Agroha Dham
 Agroha Mound

References

 
Cities and towns in Hisar district